Sofia Kligkopoulou (born 6 January 1970) is a Greek former basketball player who competed in the 2004 Summer Olympics.

References

1970 births
Living people
Greek women's basketball players
Olympic basketball players of Greece
Basketball players at the 2004 Summer Olympics
Basketball players from Athens